The 1955 Tour de Hongrie was the 16th edition of the Tour de Hongrie cycle race and was held from 13 to 17 September 1955. The race started and finished in Budapest. The race was won by Győző Török.

Route

General classification

References

1955
Tour de Hongrie
Tour de Hongrie